The 1922 Maine Black Bears football team was an American football team that represented the University of Maine during the 1922 college football season. In its second season under head coach Fred Brice, the team compiled a 6–2 record and was recognized as the Maine state champion.  The team played its home games at Alumni Field in Orono, Maine. Raymond Lunge was the team captain.

Schedule

References

Maine
Maine Black Bears football seasons
Maine Black Bears football